Jeffrey ("Jeff") Mason Fishback (born November 20, 1941, in San Mateo, California) is a retired middle- and long-distance runner from the United States. He won the gold medal in the men's 3000 metres steeplechase event at the 1963 Pan American Games in Brazil.

Fishback represented his native country at the 1964 Summer Olympics  in Tokyo, Japan. He was runner-up in the steeplechase at the 1962 NCAAs for San Jose State College coached by Lloyd (Bud) Winter. Fishback was affiliated with the Santa Clara Valley Youth Village .

Personal Bests
2 miles – 8:50 (1962)
Steeplechase – 8:40.4 (1964)
5,000 metres – 14:32.8 (1962)

References
 

1941 births
Living people
American male middle-distance runners
American male long-distance runners
Athletes (track and field) at the 1963 Pan American Games
Athletes (track and field) at the 1964 Summer Olympics
Olympic track and field athletes of the United States
Track and field athletes from California
Sportspeople from the San Francisco Bay Area
Track and field athletes from San Jose, California
People from San Mateo, California
American male steeplechase runners
San Jose State University alumni
Pan American Games gold medalists for the United States
Pan American Games medalists in athletics (track and field)
Medalists at the 1963 Pan American Games
20th-century American people